Magazine School District is a school district based in Magazine, Arkansas. The district serves approximately 600 students in prekindergarten through grade 12 and employs more than 115 educators and staff at its two schools and district offices.

The school district encompasses  of land in Logan County and serves all or portions of Magazine, Paris, Booneville, and Blue Mountain.

The district and schools mascot and athletic emblem is the Rattlers with black and red serving as the school colors.

Schools 
 J. D. Leftwich High School, serving grades 7 through 12.
 Magazine Elementary School, serving prekindergarten through grade 6.

References

External links
 

Education in Logan County, Arkansas
School districts in Arkansas